The Jewish Conservative Party was a political party of the First Czechoslovak Republic. It was created in August 1921 as a regional Carpathian Ruthenia splinter party from the Jewish Party by Markus Ungar, who was the top candidate of the Jewish Economic Party in Carpathian Ruthenia for the 1925 Czechoslovak parliamentary elections.

Bibliography
Lenni Brenner, Zionism in the Age of the Dictators. A Reappraisal. (16. The Jewish Parties of Eastern Europe, Czechoslovakia – 2.4 Per Cent of an Empire), 1983
Kateřina Čapková, "Židovská Strana", in: YIVO Encyclopaedia, YIVO Institute for Jewish Research
Marie Crhová, “Jewish Politics in Central Europe: The Case of the Jewish Party in Interwar Czechoslovakia,” Jewish Studies at the CEU 2 (1999–2001)

Agudat Yisrael
Agrarian parties
Ashkenazi Jewish culture in Europe
Haredi Judaism in Europe
Interwar minority parties in Czechoslovakia
Jews and Judaism in Czechoslovakia
Orthodox Jewish political parties
Political parties established in 1921